Made is a 1972 British drama film directed by John Mackenzie. It revolves around the story of a relationship between a young single mother, played by Carol White, and an insecure rock star, played by singer Roy Harper.

Plot
Valerie is a single mother working as a switchboard operator in Brighton while caring for her infant son as well as her mother, who is suffering from multiple sclerosis. She draws the interest of Mahdav, who is forcefully aggressive, as well as Father Dyson, who is controlling, but she has little time for either of them. She becomes infatuated with the touring musician Mike when she hears him speak about the unnecessary guilt placed on the innocent by religion. The two make love before he leaves to continue touring, making Father Tyson jealous. Valerie's mother, now in a hospital, complains about her condition in order to gain more attention from Valerie. Valerie leaves her child with June as she visits her mother, only to find that she was exaggerating her complaints. While Valerie is visiting her mother, June gets caught in a conflict between football hooligans and the pram is knocked down some steps, killing Valerie's child. Valerie finds little solace in those around her until Mike returns, bringing a small bit of joy. Valerie receives a note that her mother's condition has worsened but she spends the night with Mike instead of going to visit her. Father Tyson arrives and tells her that her mother has died and gets into an argument with Mike. Valerie takes Mike's words to heart and seeks to love who she can when she can instead of requiring anything permanent. She visits Mahdav and allows him to have sex with her but afterwards he becomes possessive, insisting that he is in love and that she is his wife. A constable separates them and drives her home. Mike, now in Los Angeles, releases a song titled "The Social Casualty" containing lyrics about Valerie's tragedies. Valerie hears the song on the radio and begins to cry.

Cast
Carol White as Valerie Marshall
Roy Harper as Mike Preston
John Castle as Father Dyson
Margery Mason as Mrs. Marshall
Doremy Vernon as June
Sam Dastor as Mahdav
Richard Vanstone as Ray
Michael Cashman as Joe
Brian Croucher as Arthur
Ray Smith as First Policeman
Carl Rigg as Second Policeman
Bob Harris as Interviewer
Sean Hewitt as Andy
Peter Jenner as Mike's M.D.
Len Jones as Barry
Ivor Butler as Dave
Ian Ramsey as Kevin
Colin Pilditch as Jacko
Colin Daniels as Peter
Michael Tarn as Charlie
Jenny Donnison as Janice
Yvonne McKain as Yvonne
Sara Clee as Ann
Babs Jessup as Babs
Peter Miles as Doctor
Mairhi Russell as Night Nurse
Phyllis MacMahon as Irish Nurse
May Warden as Patient in Hospital
Ellis Dale as Passenger on Train
Michael Standing as Young Man on Train
Nell Curran as Young Lady on Train
Paddy Joyce as Engineer
Christopher Taynton as Engineer
Giovanna Renai as Waitress

Production
The film was based on the play No One Was Saved by Howard Barker. "The story is set in London but its happening throughout the world," said producer Joseph Janni. "Young people, searching for values, something to believe in. Some look in nearly empty churches, others in the pop world or among Jesus freaks. But who really has the answers?"

Soundtrack
The film featured excerpts from Harper's songs "The Lord's Prayer", a live excerpt from "Highway Blues", a live session of "Little Lady" and "Bank of the Dead" (a.k.a. "The Social Casualty" and "Valerie's Song") sung with alternative lyrics.

References

External links

1972 films
Films shot at EMI-Elstree Studios
Films directed by John Mackenzie (film director)
Films scored by John Cameron
British drama films
British films based on plays
1972 drama films
Films about death
Films about music and musicians
Films set in Brighton
Films set in Los Angeles
1970s English-language films
1970s British films